The 1934 season was the Hawthorn Football Club's 10th season in the Victorian Football League and 33rd overall.

Fixture

Premiership Season

Ladder

References

Hawthorn Football Club seasons